Boots Creek is a river in the Hudson Bay drainage basin in Northern Manitoba, Canada. It is a right tributary of the Nelson River.

See also
List of rivers of Manitoba

References

Rivers of Northern Manitoba
Tributaries of Hudson Bay